Jar'Edo Wens was a deliberately fictitious Wikipedia article which existed for almost 10 years before being spotted in November 2014 and deleted in March 2015. At the time, it was the longest-lasting hoax article discovered in the history of Wikipedia.

Origin 
The "Jar'Edo Wens" article was created on May 29, 2005. It was only two sentences in length and cited no sources. It claimed to be about an Australian Aboriginal god ("of earthly knowledge and physical might, created by Altjira to ensure that people did not get too arrogant or self-conceited. He is associated with victory and intelligence."), and was likely simply the name "Jared Owens", with different spacing, punctuation, and casing.

The author, an unregistered user at an Australian IP address, was active for eleven minutes in May 2005; their only other contribution was to also add "Yohrmum" (likely being a re-spelling of "Your Mum") to a list of Australian deities. This was more quickly spotted and removed, but it was almost a decade before the "Jar'Edo Wens" article was detected and deleted.

Spread 
During its nearly decade-long existence, the "Jar'Edo Wens" hoax article was translated into other language editions of Wikipedia, including French, Polish, Russian, and Turkish. Two language editions additionally included the shorter-lived "yohrmum" page. An entry was also created on Wikidata.

The hoax was unwittingly copied into a book on atheism in 2012, as part of a list of 500 "gods and religions in history that have fallen out of favour".

Discovery 
The hoax lasted nine years, nine months, and three days on Wikipedia. New article creation had already been restricted to registered users since the Seigenthaler incident in September 2005. Although this made new fake articles more difficult to establish, existing hoax articles (especially low-trafficked ones) could more easily go unnoticed.

In 2009, the article was tagged with the classification "multiple issues", including a lack of sources. However, it was only in November 2014 that the article was flagged as a possible hoax. It was finally proposed for deletion on March 1, 2015, and the deletion was confirmed two days later by an administrator. Wikipediocracy, a website for Wikipedia criticism, publicised the hoax on March 15, 2015, after which it was widely reported by more general news sites.

See also
Archived Jar'Edo Wens hoax on Wikipedia
Deletion discussion on Wikipedia
List of hoaxes on Wikipedia

References

2005 hoaxes
Internet hoaxes
Wikipedia controversies
Fictional gods
Fictitious entries